Williams Lake River is a tributary of the Fraser River in the Canadian province of British Columbia.

Course
Williams Lake River originates in Williams Lake, whose main tributary is the San Jose River. From Williams Lake the Williams Lake River flows a short distance west to join the Fraser River.

See also
List of British Columbia rivers

References

Tributaries of the Fraser River
Rivers of British Columbia
Cariboo Land District